Serizawa (written: 芹沢 or 芹澤) is a Japanese surname. Notable people with the surname include:

, Japanese singer-songwriter
, Japanese fencer
, Japanese textile designer
, Japanese samurai and commander of the Shinsengumi
, Japanese artist
, Japanese golfer
, Japanese singer/voice actress

Fictional characters
, character in the manga series Nana
 Dr. Serizawa from the Godzilla Franchise. In the first movie, Daisuke Serizawa created the weapon that killed the first Godzilla and inadvertently created the monster Destroyah. in the Legendary Pictures reboot series, Ishiro Serizawa is the operation leader of PROJECT: MONARCH.
 Katsuya Serizawa (芹沢 克也), a character in the manga series Mob Psycho 100

Japanese-language surnames